Serge Bando N'Gambé (born 11 May 1988 in Cameroon) is a French footballer who now plays for Fleury 91 in his home country.

Career

Bando N'Gambé started his senior career with Olympique Saint-Quentin. In 2016, he signed for Okzhetpes in the Kazakhstan Premier League, where he made thirty appearances and scored nine goals. After that, he played for Kazakh club Irtysh Pavlodar, and French clubs JA Drancy and Fleury 91, where he now plays.

References

External links 
 Du Kazakhstan à... Drancy 
 Football: Au Kazakhstan, l'ancien caladois Serge Bando resplendit 
 at Footballdatabase.eu 
 Foot National Profile

French footballers
French expatriate footballers
Expatriate footballers in Kazakhstan
JA Drancy players
FC Irtysh Pavlodar players
Olympique Saint-Quentin players
FC Okzhetpes players
FC Montceau Bourgogne players
Jura Sud Foot players
FC Villefranche Beaujolais players
Association football forwards
Association football midfielders
1988 births
Living people